Kalmash (Qalmaş) is a rural locality (a village) in Kaltasinsky Selsoviet, Kaltasinsky District, Bashkortostan, Russia. The population was 503 as of 2010. There are 12 streets.

Geography 
Kalmash is located 7 km east of Kaltasy (the district's administrative centre) by road. Novotokranovo is the nearest rural locality.

References 

Rural localities in Kaltasinsky District